Savvy may refer to:

Arts and entertainment
 Savvy (novel), a 2008 children's fantasy novel by Ingrid Law
 Savvy Records, a defunct American record label
 Savvy, of the American pop duo Savvy & Mandy
 Savvy, an American pop group whose members appear in the sitcom The Wannabes

Products and companies
 Savvy, Freelance marketplace
 Savvy Vodka, a brand of vodka
 Proton Savvy, a supermini car
 Savvy, a computer language for programming the RB5X and other robots

People
 Charles M. Cooke, Jr. (1886–1970), nicknamed "Savvy", United States Navy admiral
 Charles Read (naval officer) (1840–1890), nicknamed "Savvy", United States Navy and Confederate States Navy officer
 Souvik Gupta (born 1983), nicknamed "Savvy", Indian musician, singer and composer

See also
 Business acumen, business savvy or media savvy
 Common sense
 Intelligence
 Jack Sparrow, a fictional pirate character who notably uses the catchphrase "Savvy?"
 Salvi (disambiguation)
 Savi (disambiguation)
 Savy (disambiguation)